Eulobus californicus, is a species of flowering plant in the evening primrose family known by the common name California suncup. It is native to California, Arizona, and adjacent northwestern Mexico, where it grows in scrub, chaparral, and desert plant communities.

Description
Eulobus californicus is an annual herb which produces a basal rosette of leaves and then bolts a slender, erect stem which can exceed 1.5 meters in height. The larger leaves are located in the ground-level rosette; those on the stem are small and thready.

The upper stem is an inflorescence bearing widely spaced flowers on long pedicels. Each flower is a cup of four bright yellow petals, sometimes with red speckles near the bases. Behind the flowers are four smaller sepals, which are greenish and reflexed back against the pedicel. The fruit is a cylindrical capsule 4 to 10 centimeters long.

References

External links

Camissonia californica - Photo gallery

Onagraceae
Flora of California
Flora of Arizona
Flora of Northwestern Mexico
Flora of the Sonoran Deserts
Flora of the California desert regions
Natural history of the California chaparral and woodlands
Natural history of the Channel Islands of California
Natural history of the Colorado Desert
Natural history of the Mojave Desert
Natural history of the Peninsular Ranges
Natural history of the Santa Monica Mountains
Natural history of the Transverse Ranges
Plants described in 1840
Flora without expected TNC conservation status